Iresine herbstii, or Herbst's bloodleaf, is a species of flowering plant in the family Amaranthaceae. Some call this plant the chicken gizzard plant.

References

External links

 C Nencini, F Cavallo, G Bruni, A Capasso, V De Feo, (2006). "Affinity of Iresine herbstii and Brugmansia arborea extracts on different cerebral receptors", Journal of Ethnopharmacology.
 

herbstii